John Paterson (1604–1679) was the Bishop of Ross in Scotland.

Life

Paterson graduated from King's College, Aberdeen in 1624, and was appointed to the church of Foveran, Aberdeenshire, in 1632. He refused to sign the National Covenant of 1639, and fled to England to the king. In July of the following year, however, he recanted in a sermon before the general assembly and was restored to his church at Foveran.

Paterson was a member of the commission of the assembly in 1644, 1645, 1648 and 1649. In 1661 he was named a commissioner for the visitation of the university of Aberdeen. In 1649 he had left Foveran to become minister of Ellon in Aberdeenshire. He was among the benefactors contributing to the erection of a new building at King's College, Aberdeen, in 1658.

In 1659 Paterson was translated to the ministry of Aberdeen (the third charge). In 1662 he was appointed the Bishop of Ross, being consecrated on 7 May 1662 at Holyrood Palace, Edinburgh. He was opposed to the preaching of the Covenanting Presbytrian John M'Gilligen. He died in January 1679.

Family

Paterson was married to Elizabeth Ramsay, by whom he had six sons and a daughter. His children were John Paterson (Archbishop of Glasgow), George Paterson of Seafield (commissary); Sir William Paterson of Granton (barrister and clerk to the privy council); Thomas Paterson; Robert Paterson (principal of Marischal College, Aberdeen); James Paterson; and a daughter, Isabella, who married Kenneth Mackenzie of Suddie.

References

Sources
Keith, Robert, An Historical Catalogue of the Scottish Bishops: Down to the Year 1688, (London, 1824)

Pearce, A. S. Wayne, "Paterson, John (1604–1679)", Oxford Dictionary of National Biography, Oxford University Press, 2004 retrieved 10 May 2007

Attribution

1604 births
1679 deaths
Alumni of the University of Aberdeen
Bishops of Ross (Scotland)
Scottish Restoration bishops
Members of the Parliament of Scotland 1661–1663
Members of the Parliament of Scotland 1669–1674
Members of the Convention of the Estates of Scotland 1678